A Speakers' Corner is an outdoor area for public speaking.

Speakers' Corner may also refer to:

Speakers' Corner (TV series), Canadian television series
Speakers' Corner, Singapore, in Hong Lim Park
Speakers' Corner, Hyde Park, London, England